The 1986 Manitoba municipal elections were held in October 1986 to elect mayors, councillors and school trustees in various communities throughout Manitoba, Canada.

Cities

Brandon

Little appears to have served as a Brandon city councillor from 1986 to 1989.  She may have been elected in a 1985 by-election prior to that.

Towns

Hartney

Footnotes

Municipal elections in Manitoba
1986 elections in Canada
1986 in Manitoba
October 1986 events in Canada